Farhad Pirbal (born 20 August 1961) is a Kurdish writer, philosopher, singer, poet, painter and critic. He was born in the city of Erbil (Hawler) in Southern Kurdistan. He studied Kurdish language and literature in the University of Sulaymaniyah. In 1986, he left Kurdistan to Denmark, Germany, and finally settling in France. He continued his studies in University of Sorbonne in the field of Kurdish literature. After going back to Southern Kurdistan, in 1994, he established the Sharafkhan Badlisi cultural center.

Bibliography

Fiction
 Mal awa, ey Wilatekem (Goodbye, My Country), Play, 1998. 
 Heşîşkêşekan (The Weed Smokers), Play, 2000
 Petatexorekan (The Potato Eaters), Stories, 2000.
 Mûlazim Tehsîn û Şity Tirîş (Lieutenant Tahsin and Other Things), 2001.
 Santyago Dî Kompostêla (Santiago de Compostela), Novel, 2002.
 Mindalbaz (Pedophile), Novel, 2003.
 Piyawêky Şepqereşy Paltoreşy Pelawşîn (A Man with a Black Hat and Black Pants and Blue Shies), Novel, 2003.
 Hikayetekanî Bawkim (My Dad's Stories), Novel, 2007.
 Hotêl Ewrûpa (Hotel Europe), Novel, 2010.
 Ew Pyawey Tenya Le Xewda Dinyay Pê Ciwan Bû (The Man that Only Seen World as Beautiful in His Dreams), Play, 2010.
 Hewt Wêney Rûtî Jiny Cenabî Wezîr (Seven Nude Pictures of Sir Minister's Wife), Novel, 2016.
 Zery Naw Zibil (Gold in Trash), Novel.
 Zar û Marekan.
 Re'îş Remezanekan.
 Çîm Dy? (What Did I See?). 
 Ew Kitêbaney Jiyanyan Gorîm (The Books that Changed My Life).
 Qebrêky Sêgoşe (A Trangke Grave), Novel, 2017.

Non-Fiction

 Încîl le Mêjûy Edebiyatî Kûrd (Bible in the History of Kurdish Literature), (1857–1957).
 Serçawekanî Kûrdnasy (Sources of Kurdology), Research, 1998.
 Destpêky Serheldany Pexşanî Kûrdî (The Beginning of the Kurdish Prose), Research, 1999.
 Jeneral Şerîf Paşa (General Sharif Pasha), Biography, 2001.
 Kronolocyay Kûrdistan (Kurdish Chronology).
 Ebdulrehîm Rehmî Hekary (Abdulrahim Rahmi Hakary), Biography, 2002.
 Rêbaze Edebiyêkan (Literalic Movements), 2004.
 Wêney Kûrd le Erşîfy Rojhelatnasekanda (The Picture of Kurds in the Eastologists' Archives), Research, 2005.

External links

References

The anthology of Kurdish stories, by Firat Cewerî

1961 births
Living people
University of Paris alumni
Kurdish-language writers
Iraqi writers
People from Erbil
Iraqi Kurdish poets
21st-century Iraqi poets
20th-century Iraqi poets